Leonard Grey, Lord Deputy of Ireland (1479/149228 July 1541), known as Lord Leonard Grey prior to 1536, served as Lord Deputy of Ireland from 1536 to 1540.

Family
Leonard Grey was a younger son of Thomas Grey, 1st Marquess of Dorset and Cecily Bonville, Baroness Harington and Bonville.

Career
On receiving instructions from King Henry VIII, Grey commanded an army which he led in 1535 against Irish rebels who would not acknowledge Henry's supremacy as supreme head of the Church of England, and renounce the Pope. He was said to have been so cruel that he shortened the life of the Lord Deputy of Ireland, William Skeffington, and succeeded him as Lord Deputy. Grey was created Viscount Grane in the Peerage of Ireland on 2 January 1536, but never assumed the title. 

He was active in marching against the rebels and he presided over the parliament of 1536, but he was soon at variance with the powerful family of the Butlers and with some of the privy councillors, including the highly influential John Rawson, 1st Viscount Clontarf.

On 11 July 1537, Grey as Lord Deputy visited Galway. This was the first visit of a King's Deputy to the town, and marked the start of closer relations between the town and the Anglo-Irish administration in Dublin. He was lavishly entertained and stayed for seven days.

Grey was accused of allowing the escape of his sister Elizabeth's son, the young Earl of Kildare to France in 1539, which he strenuously denied, and the quarrel with the Butlers became fiercer than ever. 

Grey was nevertheless tried and attainted of high treason, and subsequently executed at the Tower of London on 28 July 1541 by the orders of Henry VIII.

Carrigogunnell massacre
Grey was implicated in several massacres in Ireland; the most notorious took place at Carrigogunnell Castle in 1536 (then part of Thomond, it would later become part of County Limerick in the Kingdom of Ireland). As an active participant in the Tudor conquest of Ireland, he was one of the figures who brought a new element to Irish warfare, where the killing of non-combatants by Crown forces was seen as acceptable by the establishment.

Marriages and issue
Grey is said to have married firstly Elizabeth Arundel, widow of Sir Giles Daubeney, and secondly Eleanor Sutton, daughter of Edward Sutton, 2nd Baron Dudley by Cecily Willoughby, daughter and coheiress of Sir William Willoughby; however, according to Lyons it is unclear whether Grey ever married. He is mentioned in the will of his brother, Sir John Grey.

References

Bibliography

 
 Hardiman's History of Galway: Chapter 4: From 1484 to the commencement of the Irish Rebellion in 1641
 
 The Church in Ireland during the reigns of Henry VIII and Edward VI. (1509–1553) from "History of the Catholic Church from the Renaissance to the French Revolution" by Rev. James MacCaffrey, S.J., 1914

1541 deaths
Viscounts in the Peerage of Ireland
Peers of Ireland created by Henry VIII
People executed under the Tudors for treason against England
Executions at the Tower of London
Prisoners in the Tower of London
Executed English people
Younger sons of marquesses
Year of birth uncertain
16th-century Irish politicians
Leonard
Executed Irish people
People executed by Tudor England by decapitation
People executed under Henry VIII
Irish politicians convicted of crimes
Lords Lieutenant of Ireland